9 Queen's Road Central is a skyscraper located in the Central district of Hong Kong. The building was completed in 1991. It was designed by architectural firm Wong Tung & Partners, and was developed by Hongkong Land. 9 Queen's Road Central, which stands as the 80th-tallest building in Hong Kong, is composed almost entirely of commercial office space; the podium which the building rises out of is used for retailing. It is built in Art Deco style.

See also
 List of tallest buildings in Hong Kong

References

External links

Office buildings completed in 1991
1991 establishments in Hong Kong
Skyscraper office buildings in Hong Kong